Digital Federal Credit Union (DCU) is a credit union based in Marlborough, Massachusetts.  It has over 1,025,000 members and is the largest credit union headquartered in New England as measured by assets, managing over US $9.9 billion. DCU is regulated under the authority of the National Credit Union Administration (NCUA) of the US federal government.

DCU has nineteen full-service branches in Massachusetts and four full-service branches in New Hampshire, although it has members in all 50 U.S. states.

History 

DCU was chartered in 1979 for employees of Digital Equipment Corporation following complaints to CEO Ken Olsen that employees had been having difficulty securing mortgages.

References

External links
 Official site
 National Credit Union Administration

Digital Equipment Corporation
Credit unions based in Massachusetts
Banks established in 1979